Bulletin of the American Astronomical Society (BAAS; Bull. Am. Astron. Soc.) is the journal of record for the American Astronomical Society established in 1969.  It publishes meetings of the society, obituaries of its members, and scholarly articles.  Four issues are published per year that are collected into a single volume.

Articles are indexed, and often archived, from the Astrophysics Data System, using the journal code BAAS.

External links 
 

Publications established in 1969
Astronomy journals
English-language journals
Quarterly journals
American Astronomical Society academic journals